Spilomela personalis is a moth in the family Crambidae. It is found in Cuba and Costa Rica.

References

Moths described in 1871
Spilomelinae